Yves Vander Cruysen (9 March 1963 – 24 November 2020) was a Belgian historian and political activist who served as senior alderman of Waterloo.

Biography
After studying to become a journalist, Cruysen began his career working for L'Avenir and L'Instant. He then became a spokesman for the Walloon Minister of the Economy and started several television programmes, including Les balades de Sandrine and L'odyssée de l'Objet. He helped upgrade the site of the Battle of Waterloo and sat on the executive board of Wallonie-Bruxelles Tourisme.

He was Alderman of Culture of Waterloo from 1991 until his death and was a Provincial Councillor for Walloon Brabant from 1999 until his death. He created the "Waterloo Connection", which brought international attention to the Battle of Waterloo.

Yves Vander Cruysen died of COVID-19 on 24 November 2020, at the age of 57.

Bibliography
Trois siècles d’Histoire à Waterloo (1987)
Les Cent Jours de Waterloo (1990)
Waterloo (1996)
Récits de guerre en Brabant wallon (2004)
Un siècle d’histoire en Brabant wallon (2007)
La Wallonie vue par les grands écrivains (2011)
Curieuses histoires des aventures belges. Quand nous partions à la conquête du Monde (2011)
Curieuses histoires des inventeurs belges (2012)
Pierre Minuit, l’homme qui acheta Manhattan (2013)
Made in France, non c’est du Belge (2013)
Waterloo démythifié (2014)
De Waterloo à Sainte-Hélène (2015)
Les plus belles traces de Victor Hugo en Belgique (2016)
Waterloo, 70 000 ans d’histoires (2017)

Distinctions
Knight of the Order of Leopold
Knight of the Order of Leopold II

References

1963 births
2020 deaths
People from Uccle
20th-century Belgian historians
Belgian activists
Deaths from the COVID-19 pandemic in Belgium
21st-century Belgian historians